Michael S. Perlis is an American business executive who currently serves as vice chairman and strategic adviser at Forbes Media LLC. He previously worked for Playboy, SoftBank Capital, and Ziff Davis. Perlis served as CEO of Forbes from December 2010 until October 2017, when he became vice chairman and strategic adviser.

Education 

Perlis attended Syracuse University, graduating in 1976 with a BA in communications. He currently serves on the Board of Advisors of Syracuse's Newhouse School of Public Communications.

Career 

Perlis began his career in media in Camden, Maine as co-founder of New England Publications. He later worked as publisher for International Data Group before moving on to Rodale Press in Emmaus, Pennsylvania to serves as publisher of Runner's World, Bicycling, Active Sports Network, and other magazines. In September 1985, Rodale Press named Perlis as publisher of Runner's World magazine, a globally circulated monthly magazine for runners published by Rodale Press. After Rodale Press acquired the George A. Hirsch magazine Runner from CBS Magazines in January 1987 and merged it into Runner's World magazine, Perlis was replaced as publisher of Runner's World magazine by Hirsch. In 1989, Perlis left Rodale to work for Playboy Publishing Group. Succeeding Hugh Hefner as publisher, Perlis was responsible for all publishing and related product activity worldwide, helping launch the companies' new media initiative that included playboy.com. From 1996-1998 he served as President and Chief Operating Officer at TVSM before accepting a role as President and Chief Executive Officer of Ziff Davis Media Inc.

Perlis' transition to the venture capital industry came in 2000, when he accepted a role as partner of Softbank Capital, a Massachusetts-based technology and telecom focused group.

He returned to the media industry in late 2010, accepting the President and CEO role at Forbes Media. At Forbes, Perlis has focused on the brand's digital footprint, overseeing the magazine's digital growth to over 30 million unique users a month.

As of 2020, he is on the board of directors of magazine publishers Conde Nast.

Personal 

Perlis lives in Connecticut and Maine and is a trustee of Outward Bound.

References

Living people
Year of birth missing (living people)